Jerome O'Bryan "L. J." Hoes (born March 5, 1990) is an American former professional baseball outfielder. He played in Major League Baseball (MLB) for the Baltimore Orioles and the Houston Astros.

Early life
Hoes was born in Washington, DC, where he attended St. John's College High School. Hoes was drafted by the Baltimore Orioles as a second baseman in the third round of the 2008 Major League Baseball Draft.

Professional career

Baltimore Orioles
Hoes was assigned to the GCL Orioles, where in 48 games, he hit .308 with 1 HR, 18 RBI and 10 SB. Hoes played 2009 with Single-A Delmarva, where in 119 games, he hit .260 with 2 HR, 7 RBI and 20 SB. Hoes spent most of 2010 with A-Advanced Frederick, but also had a rehab assignment with Low-A Aberdeen and a 3-game stint with Double-A Bowie. In 108 total games, he hit .290 with 4 HR, 50 RBI and 11 SB. After beginning 2011 with Frederick, Hoes was promoted to Bowie in late May. He was used mostly as an outfielder in Bowie, and has played in the outfield since then. In 136 total games, he hit .285 with 9 HR, 75 RBI and 20 SB.

Prior to the 2012 season, Hoes was ranked by Baseball America as the Orioles fifth best prospect. Hoes began the year in Bowie, but was promoted to Triple-A Norfolk in June. In 133 games before being called up, he hit .287 with 5 HR, 54 RBI and 20 SB.

Hoes was called up to the majors for the first time on September 11, 2012. He made his debut on September 25, where he came in as a pinch-runner. His first plate appearance, a groundout, came the next day as a pinch-hitter. After the season, he played for the Mesa Solar Sox, where in 19 games, he hit .257 with 4 SB.

Hoes began 2013 with Norfolk, where he played until he was recalled on July 28.

Houston Astros
On July 31, 2013, Hoes was traded to the Houston Astros with Josh Hader for Bud Norris. He made his Astros debut that night, going 0–5 in an 11–0 win over the Orioles. Hoes had appeared in one game for the 2013 Orioles before the trade. He played in 46 more games with the Astros that year, hitting .287 with 1 HR and 10 RBI. Hoes hit .172 for the Astros in 2014. He was optioned to AAA Oklahoma City RedHawks on August 15, 2014.

Return to Baltimore
After the 2015 season, Hoes was designated for assignment by the Astros, and later traded to the Orioles for cash considerations. On January 26, 2016, Hoes was designated for assignment by Baltimore to make room for Efren Navarro on the 40-man roster. He was sent outright to the Norfolk Tides, the Orioles AAA affiliate, on February 4, 2016. He became a free agent on November 7, 2016.  On February 24, 2017, he was suspended for 50 games for a second positive drug test and was then released by the Norfolk Tides.

Southern Maryland Blue Crabs
On June 23, 2017, Hoes signed with the Southern Maryland Blue Crabs of the Atlantic League of Professional Baseball. He became a free agent after the 2017 season.

Third stint with Orioles
On July 14, 2018, Hoes signed a minor league deal with the Baltimore Orioles. He elected free agency on November 2, 2018.

References

External links

1990 births
Aberdeen IronBirds players
African-American baseball players
Baseball players from Washington, D.C.
Baltimore Orioles players
Bowie Baysox players
Delmarva Shorebirds players
Frederick Keys players
Fresno Grizzlies players
Gulf Coast Orioles players
Houston Astros players
Leones del Caracas players
American expatriate baseball players in Venezuela
Living people
Major League Baseball outfielders
Mesa Solar Sox players
Norfolk Tides players
Oklahoma City RedHawks players
Southern Maryland Blue Crabs players
21st-century African-American sportspeople